Synuchus vivalis is a species of ground beetle in the subfamily Harpalinae. It was described by Illiger in 1798.

References

Synuchus
Beetles described in 1798